is a Japanese professional footballer who plays as a centre back for J1 League club Cerezo Osaka.

Club stats

References

External links
Profile at Cerezo Osaka

1987 births
Living people
Association football people from Hyōgo Prefecture
Japanese footballers
J1 League players
J2 League players
Cerezo Osaka players
Hokkaido Consadole Sapporo players
Kashiwa Reysol players
Association football defenders
People from Akashi, Hyōgo